Kurdamir Air Base is a military airbase in Kurdamir (also known as Kyurdamir or Kürdəmir), the capital of the Kurdamir District (rayon) in Azerbaijan.

At the end of the 1980s the 976 Bomber Aviation Regiment Инстербургский flying Sukhoi Su-24 and Sukhoi Su-17 aircraft was based at Kurdamir. The regiment, which was descended from the 976th Fighter Aviation Regiment of the World War II period, was part of the 34th Air Army of the Soviet Air Forces.

See also
List of airports in Azerbaijan

References

Airports in Azerbaijan
Azerbaijani Air Force bases
Kurdamir District